Bhavna is a 1984 Hindi film directed by Pravin Bhatt in directorial debut of the cinematographer. The film stars Shabana Azmi, Marc Zuber, Kanwaljit Singh, Saeed Jaffrey, Rohini Hattangadi, Satish Shah and Urmila Matondkar (as child artiste). The film's music is by Bappi Lahiri.

Plot
"Bhavna" the movie is a story of a less privileged woman. A young lady, an orphan named Bhavna Saxena who lives all alone in a city meets a man named Ajay Kapoor in a garden, sketching her portrait. They became friends and later on the friendship turns into love. Eventually they got married, however, Kapoor's dad had not granted permission for this marriage. Ajay is an artist who does not make enough money. Bhavna tries to sell his  paintings going from door to door, but their financial condition is poor. In the midst of this worsening financial situation, Bhavna realises that she is pregnant with Ajay's child. Ajay is unhappy to hear this as he feels that he cannot afford the expenditure of raising a child. Unable to endure the worsening financial situation, Ajay decides to go and meet his rich millionaire father who resides in another city. He tells Bhavna that he would return in a couple of days.  Ajay leaves Bhavna alone and many days pass. The days turn into weeks and weeks into months. Still there is no news of Ajay. Ajay never came back to Bhavna. Bhavna manages to procure Ajay's father's address and goes in search of Ajay. Bhavna is  astonished to see that Ajay has married another woman as per his father's wishes. Dejected, Bhanva confides her sorrows to Shobha, her best friend. But this was not the end of her struggles in life.

Cast
 Shabana Azmi as Bhavna Saxena
 Marc Zuber as Ajay Kapoor
 Kanwaljit Singh as Dr. Anil B. Saxena
 Urmila Matondkar as Ram Kishen's Daughter (child artiste)
 Rohini Hattangadi as Shobha
 Saeed Jaffrey as Ram Kishen
 Ashalata Wabgaonkar as Mrs. Ram Kishen
 Vikas Anand as Nawab
 Satish Shah as Mr. Sinha
 Rajesh Puri as Raju (Ajay's Friend)

Soundtrack
Lyricist: Kaifi Azmi

"Tu Kahan Aa Gayi Zindagi" - Lata Mangeshkar
"Tu Kahan Aa Gayi Zindagi" (v2) - Bappi Lahiri
"Paheli Chhoti Si" - Kavita Paudwal, Vanita Mishra, Gurpreet Kaur, Asha Bhosle
"Dekho Din Ye Na Dhalne Paye, Har Pal Ik Sadi Ho Jaaye" - Asha Bhosle, Kavita Paudwal
"Mere Dil Mai Too Hee Too Hai" - Chitra Singh, Jagjit Singh

Awards 
32nd Filmfare Awards:

Won

 Best Actress – Shabana Azmi

Nominated

 Best Supporting Actress – Rohini Hattangadi

References

External links
 

1984 films
Indian drama films
1980s Hindi-language films
Films about women in India
Films scored by Bappi Lahiri
1984 directorial debut films
1984 drama films
Hindi-language drama films